Phạm Đăng Lâm (12 June 1918 – 2 June 1975) was a South Vietnamese diplomat, who served as Minister of Foreign Affairs of South Vietnam from 1963 to 1964, and again from November 1964 to 1965. He served as Deputy Prime Minister of South Vietnam from 1967 to 1968 under Prime Minister Nguyễn Văn Lộc. He was the last South Vietnamese ambassador to the UK He was known for being the chief negogiator on the South Vietnamese side in the 1973 Paris Peace Talks to end the Vietnam War and the co-existence of North Vietnam and South Vietnam.

Early life
He was born on 12 June 1916 in Vĩnh Long, Cochinchina, French Indochina.

Political career
He has been a diplomat in the Ministry of Foreign Affairs since 1949, serving in both the State of Vietnam and South Vietnam.

Paris Peace Accords
On the morning of 27 November 1972 Lâm met with the head of the U.S. Delegation of the Paris Peace Accords, William J. Porter
to discuss the drafting of the Peace documents. After the meeting Porter reported to Henry Kissinger regarding Lâm's thought,

"He [Lâm] stressed need for preparing Saigon psychologically for draft agreement. He said that when agreement was presented in Saigon by you, it had come as a ‘bomb’ because Ambassador Bunker had briefed President Thiệu that October 8–11 meetings had produced indications of serious DRV intention to negotiate and willingness to separate military from political issues, but nothing more than this bare outline. Thus when draft agreement was presented as best which would be achieved at that time, Saigon leadership did not understand fully why the United States believed that to be so."

"Lâm said question of U.S. public opinion and Congressional support is major factor which had not been grasped earlier by Saigon, and that you also said some very important things about US/SVN relationships after conclusion of the accord. If these things had been grasped earlier by Saigon, they would have greatly helped the process of psychological preparation."

At the Paris Peace Accords, regarding both North Vietnam and South Vietnam, Lâm stresses that such co-existence must be based on mutual respect and the right of the people of North and South Vietnam to follow whatever paths they have chosen. He added that this also meant North and South Vietnam could have friendly relations with neighboring countries. If the Paris Peace Accords live up to its role, Lâm states "The solidarity of Southeast Asia will then become a living reality." According to Lâm, for peace and solidarity to occur in Southeast Asia, it requires work and effort from everyone worldwide to maintain it.

Personal life
In addition to his native Vietnamese, Lam was also fluent in French and English.

He died on 2 June 1975 in Paris after a long battle with an illness.

References 

1916 births
1975 deaths
South Vietnamese politicians
Ambassadors of South Vietnam to the United Kingdom